Danger is the fourth studio album by Nigerian recording artists P-Square, released by Square Records on 12 September 2009. The album produced five singles—"I Love You", "Possibility", "E No Easy", "Danger" and "Gimme Dat". It features guest appearances from 2 Face Idibia and J.Martins.

Singles 
 The music video for "I Love You" was shot and directed in Nigeria by the duo's elder brother, Jude Engees Okoye. The lyrics of the song focuses on love and the expression of it.
 "Possibility" features vocals by 2 Baba. The song is a fusion of 2 Baba's "African Queen" and P-Square's "No One Like You". The music video for the song was directed by Jude Engees Okoye.
 "Danger" was recorded on 120BPM. The music video for the "Danger" was directed by Jude Engees Okoye.
 "Gimme Dat" has an uptempo beat which makes it a club banger. The music video for the song was directed by Jude Engees Okoye.

Track listing 

Notes
 "—" denotes an instrumental

Personnel 
 Peter Okoye – recording artist
 Paul Okoye – recording artist
 Innocent Ujah Idibia – featured artist
 J.Martins – featured artist
 Jude Engees Okoye – director

Release history

References

External links 
 The Official P-Square Website with songlyrics and wallpaper downloads

2009 albums
P-Square albums
Igbo-language albums
2009 in Nigerian music